Uncial 0301 (in the Gregory-Aland numbering), is a Greek-Coptic diglot uncial manuscript of the New Testament. Paleographically it has been assigned to the 5th century.

Description 

The codex contains two small parts of the text of the Gospel of John 17:1-2.2-4, on a fragment of single parchment leaf (6.82 cm by 7 cm). It was written in one column per page, 14 lines per page, in uncial letters. 

Because it is very small fragment, it was suggested, it is a talisman, but the manuscript is more probable. 

Currently it is dated by the INTF to the 5th century.

It is currently housed at the Schøyen Collection (1367) in Oslo.

See also 

 List of New Testament uncials
 Biblical manuscripts
 Textual criticism

References

Further reading 

 Joseph van Haelst, "Catalogue des papyrus littéraires juifs et chrétiens", Paris 1976.

Greek New Testament uncials
5th-century biblical manuscripts